Kenneth Walker III may refer to:

 Kenneth Walker III (running back) (born 2000), American football running back
 Kenneth Walker III (wide receiver) (born 1994), American football wide receiver